A Cepheid is a type of pulsating variable star.

It may also refer to:
 Cepheid (company), a molecular diagnostics company
 Cepheid, a fictional alien species in the Isaac Asimov novel Blind Alley

See also
 Cepheus (constellation)
 Cepheidae (jellyfish)